Floyd Harold Crain (born June 3, 1929), was an American politician in the state of Tennessee. Crain served in the Tennessee House of Representatives from 1979 to 1989. A Democrat, he also served a stint as the Majority Floor Leader in the House. He represented the state's 82nd legislative district. Born in Lauderdale County, Tennessee, Crain was a pharmacist and member of the Methodist church. He is a graduate of Ripley High School and the University of Tennessee He lives in Ripley, Tennessee.

Crain married Joann Elizabeth Biggs on June 4, 1954 in Polk County, Tennessee.

References

1929 births
Possibly living people
Members of the Tennessee House of Representatives
People from Lauderdale County, Tennessee
University of Tennessee alumni